In a Groove is the second studio album (in the US) by singer/songwriter Jonny Blu, released in the United States on 21 July 2008 by Dao Feng Music and Sound Cubed Studios. It is an EP of original compositions by Jonny Blu.

Track listing
"Always Something There" – 3:45
"In a Groove" – 3:45
"Sweet Lovin' in the Afternoon" – 3:45
"Smilin' Eyes (Ain't Always Nice)" – 2:53
"Ooh-Wee" – 3:45

Personnel

Musicians
Jonny Blu – vocals, music arrangements
Myke Aaron – piano, music arrangements
Bob Malone – piano
John Chiodini – guitar
Chris Conner – bass guitar
Lee Thornberg – trumpet
 – trombone
Doug Webb – saxophone, woodwind, clarinet, flute
John Stuart – drums, percussion
Bob Malone – violin

Production
Myke Aaron – producer, engineer, mixing
Jonny Blu – producer, arranger
Myke Aaron – mixing, mastering

References

2008 EPs
Jonny Blu albums